DCKT Contemporary was a contemporary art gallery based in New York's Lower East Side. Founded in 2002, by Dennis Christie and Ken Tyburski, the gallery closed in 2014. The gallery represented emerging and established contemporary artists working in painting and sculpture to video art and photography.

Artists Represented 
Some of the Artists the Gallery represented included:

Helen Altman
Oliver Boberg
castaneda/reiman
Exene Cervenka
Sophie Crumb
Lia Halloran
Ryan Humphrey
Maria E. Piñeres
Brion Nuda Rosch
William Swanson
Michael Velliquette

Locations 
The gallery first opened in 2003 on Chelsea's West 24th Street. In March 2008, it relocated to New York City's Lower East Side, and its final location was 21 Orchard Street.

References

From Pickles to Paintings in New York's Lower East Side
Hustler of Culture Interview with Dennis Christie
Ryan Humphrey: All or Nothing
DCKT Contemporary at Pulse Miami

2002 establishments in New York City